The Riding Facility, Riem, also known as Olympic Riding Stadium (German: Olympia-Reitstadion Riem), was a temporary facility constructed in the Riem section of Munich, Germany. For the 1972 Summer Olympics. they hosted the equestrian individual jumping, cross-country eventing, and the riding portion of the modern pentathlon competition.

They were constructed on the grounds of the Riding Academy and the Munich Riding Club.

References
1972 Summer Olympics official report. Volume 2. Part 2. pp. 207–8.

Venues of the 1972 Summer Olympics
Olympic equestrian venues
Olympic modern pentathlon venues
Defunct sports venues in Germany
Buildings and structures in Munich
Sports venues in Bavaria
Sports venues in Munich